Tadavalga  is a village in the southern state of Karnataka, India. It is located in the Indi taluk of Bijapur district in Karnataka.

Demographics
 India census, Tadavalga had a population of 8971 with 4604 males and 4367 females.

See also
 Bijapur district
 Districts of Karnataka

References

External links
 http://Bijapur.nic.in/

Villages in Bijapur district, Karnataka